Joao Rojas may refer to:

 Joao Rojas (footballer, born 1989), Ecuadorian football winger for São Paulo
 Joao Rojas (footballer, born 1997), Ecuadorian football winger for Emelec